Gazette Building may refer to:

in Canada
Gazette Building (Montreal, Quebec)

in the United States
 Gazette Building (Little Rock, Arkansas)
Journal-Gazette Building, Fort Wayne, Indiana, listed on the NRHP in Allen County, Indiana